Gordon Clark (1902–1985) was American philosopher and theologian.

Gordon Clark may also refer to:

Gordon Clark (footballer) (1914–1997), English fullback
Gordon "Grubby" Clark, surfboard blank manufacturer
Gordon "Nobby" Clark (born 1950), Scottish pop singer and Bay City Rollers member
Gordon Clark (activist), American activist and politician
Gordon L. Clark, professor of geography at the University of Oxford
Gordon Matta-Clark (1943–1978), American artist